The 1995–96 Wake Forest Demon Deacons men's basketball team represented Wake Forest University as members of the Atlantic Coast Conference during the 1995–96 men's college basketball season. The team was led by 7th year head coach Dave Odom, and played their home games at LJVM Coliseum.

Roster

Schedule and results

|-
!colspan=9 style=| Regular season

|-
!colspan=9 style=| ACC Tournament

|-
!colspan=9 style=| NCAA Tournament

Rankings

Awards and honors
Tim Duncan – ACC Player of the Year, Consensus First-team All-American

References

Wake Forest Demon Deacons men's basketball seasons
Wake Forest
Wake Forest